The 1929 Cork Senior Hurling Championship was the 41st staging of the Cork Senior Hurling Championship since its establishment by the Cork County Board in 1887. The draw for the opening round fixtures took place at the Cork Convention on 27 January 1929. The championship began on 24 March 1929 and ended on 17 November 1929.

Éire Óg were the defending champions, however, they were defeated by Blackrock at the semi-final stage.

On 17 November 1929, Blackrock won the championship after a 5-06 to 2-02 defeat of St. Finbarr's in the final. This was their 19th championship title overall and their first in two championship seasons.

Team changes

From Championship

Regraded to the Cork Intermediate Hurling Championship
 Cobh
 Midleton

To Championship

Promoted from the Cork Intermediate Hurling Championship
 Nemo Rangers

Amalgamation

Kinsale and Shamrocks amalgamated to form Owenabue.

Results

First round

Second round

Semi-finals

Final

References

Cork Senior Hurling Championship
Cork Senior Hurling Championship